Gone Dau is an East Fijian language spoken by about 700 people on the islands of Gone and Dau, Fiji.

References

East Fijian languages
Languages of Fiji